White Sands is a 1992 American crime thriller film directed by Roger Donaldson and starring Willem Dafoe, Mary Elizabeth Mastrantonio, Samuel L. Jackson, and Mickey Rourke. Written by Daniel Pyne for Warner Bros., the film is about a U.S. southwestern small-town sheriff who finds a body in the desert with a suitcase and $500,000. He impersonates the man and stumbles into an FBI investigation.

Plot

Ray Dolezal, a bored Torrance County, New Mexico Deputy Sheriff, investigates an apparent suicide in the desert. Alongside the body of Bob Spencer is a suitcase containing $500,000.  During the autopsy, they find a digested piece of paper with a phone number; Dolezal, posing as Spencer, calls the number and goes to a meeting, where he is robbed and instructed to meet Gorman Lennox at a restaurant. FBI agent Greg Meeker intercepts Dolezal and informs him that Spencer was an undercover agent. Now that Dolezal has lost the money, Meeker suggests he continue posing as Spencer to recover the money or help arrest Lennox.

Dolezal meets Lennox and his wealthy associate Lane Bodine and learns the money is to arm left-wing freedom fighters in South America.  The arms dealers demo the guns for Dolezal and Lennox but demand an additional $250,000 due to unforeseen expenses.  Meeker pushes the responsibility on Dolezal, who romances his way into Lane's life so she will attract rich humanitarian donors to fund the deal. Two FBI internal affairs agents suspect Dolezal of killing Spencer and stealing the money. Dolezal is forced to admit to Lane he is not really Spencer, but she agrees to help raise the money because she finds Dolezal a better alternative to the volatile Lennox.

Dolezal learns from Noreen, who had an affair with the real Spencer, that he was working with an FBI agent who likely killed him. Noreen runs away at the sight of Meeker, and the internal affairs agents grab Dolezal.  Lennox runs the agents off the road; Dolezal flees and returns to Lane.  He discovers Noreen shot dead and a Polaroid of her with Spencer and Meeker.

Dolezal breaks into a surveillance van outside Lane's house and beats up the FBI agent.  He accuses Meeker of killing Spencer and Noreen.  Meeker admits he took the $500,000 without authorization to steal it and capture Lennox at the same time, but Spencer lost his nerve and wanted out.  Meeker confronted him out in the desert and convinced him to shoot himself.  He tells Dolezal the Polaroid proves nothing, and no one will believe his word against that of a minority agent with a spotless record.

Lennox meets Dolezal and reveals the two internal affairs agents tied up in the trunk of his car.  They drive into the desert, where Lennox says he knows Dolezal is not Spencer, because Lennox is really a CIA agent who wants the arms deal to go through, ensuring the survival of the military–industrial complex.  Lennox kills the two agents and informs Dolezal that he has Lane hostage. Dolezal must find where she hid the $250,000 and meet Lennox on a deserted military base in the White Sands desert.

Dolezal uncovers the money in a briefcase buried in Lane's horse's stall. He kidnaps Meeker, takes him to White Sands, and handcuffs him to a pipe inside an abandoned building.  Dolezal explains that Lennox is CIA, the FBI will be arriving soon, and Meeker can either face punishment or try to flee.  Dolezal leaves a gun behind, so Meeker grabs it and hides inside a bathroom stall.

Lennox arrives and reveals that Lane is waiting at the base entrance. Dolezal placed the briefcase in the abandoned building, but when Lennox walks in, Meeker shoots and kills him.  After disabling Lennox's car, Dolezal picks up Lane. He drops her off at her estate and explains that he needs to return to his family. He hands her the $250,000 she had obtained through her pseudo-fund raising event.

The FBI arrives in cars and helicopters. Meeker breaks the pipe he was cuffed to and runs through the desert with the briefcase.  Dolezal left the original $500,000 he was originally suspected of stealing so the FBI will stop investigating him, but one of the agents notices footprints going out into White Sands, and they head off in pursuit.  As the FBI catches up with him, Meeker stumbles and drops the briefcase, which contains nothing but sand.

Cast

Reception 
On Rotten Tomatoes, 44% of 16 critics reviews were positive, and the average rating was 5.10/10. Metacritic assigned the film a weighted average score of 46 out of 100, based on 22 critics, indicating "mixed or average reviews". Audiences polled by CinemaScore gave the film an average grade of "B-" on an A+ to F scale.

Peter Travers of Rolling Stone wrote that the storyline was both predictable and, when Lennox is revealed to be a CIA agent, utterly confusing.  Desson Howe of The Washington Post wrote that it is never really explained why Dafoe's character has this obsession to find out the truth about Bob's death, or the various other unexplained oddities that occur in the film, such as the fact that Mastrantonio falls in love with Dafoe's character for no apparent reason.

Leonard Maltin gave the film two stars and called it "competently performed (even by Rourke) but with little else to distinguish it from dozens of its ilk”.

The film grossed $9 million in the United States and Canada and $18 million worldwide.

Home media 
The film is available on DVD with a few special options.  It includes English- and French-language and subtitle options, a filmography of some of the cast, and trailers for this and a few other films by Morgan Creek. It was released on Blu-ray from Sony Pictures Home Entertainment on April 23, 2019.

References

External links
 

1992 films
1992 crime films
American crime films
1990s English-language films
Morgan Creek Productions films
American police detective films
Tularosa Basin
Films directed by Roger Donaldson
Films produced by Scott Rudin
1990s American films